Viktor Anatolyevich Leontyev (born 27 April 1940) is a retired Soviet artistic gymnast. He competed at the 1964 Summer Olympics in all artistic gymnastics events and won a silver medal in the team all-round competition. Individually he finished in fourth place on the floor and rings.

He won three silver medals at the 1961 European championships, on the floor, pommel horse and parallel bars. The next year he won a silver medal in the team all-round competition at the world championships. 

During his career he won four national titles: on the vault (1961) and rings (1963–1965).

References

1940 births
Living people
Gymnasts at the 1964 Summer Olympics
Olympic gymnasts of the Soviet Union
Olympic silver medalists for the Soviet Union
Olympic medalists in gymnastics
Soviet male artistic gymnasts
Medalists at the 1964 Summer Olympics
Medalists at the World Artistic Gymnastics Championships
Gymnasts from Moscow